Geoff Bartley (born 1948) is an American acoustic guitarist and singer-songwriter whose musical style combines roots, blues, jazz, and traditional folk. He lives in the Boston area, where he can be found at The Can Tab Lounge in Cambridge, Massachusetts every Monday night, hosting a singer-songwriter open mic, and every Tuesday night presenting bluegrass performances and jams.

Since 1994, Bartley has played guitar regularly for Tom Paxton. On February 13, 2004, it was declared by the city of Cambridge to be Geoff Bartley Day. In 2009, he was awarded the Jerry Christen Memorial Lifetime Achievement Award by the Boston Area Coffeehouse Association. In 2015 he was the winner of the Podunk songwriting contest. He has won the New Hampshire Acoustic Guitar Contest twice and, during the 1980s, won four guitars by four-second-place wins at the National Fingerstyle Guitar Championships in Winfield, Kansas. The Folk Project calls him "an insightful songwriter with an expressive baritone voice, an exceptionally clean and tasty guitarist, and one of the best damn harmonica players in the country."

Early life and influences 
Geoff Bartley was born in New York City in 1948 and grew up on the eastern shore of Maryland. His mother played piano and his father, a doctor, played clarinet, and he grew up surrounded by classical music. In fourth grade, Bartley began to study clarinet, and in 1963 picked up the acoustic guitar. "I had no social life and no social skills, so I just spent a lot of time practicing acoustic guitar," said Bartley in 2012. In 1967, he moved to Boston to attend Boston University, and has lived also in Nevada, Colorado, Connecticut, New Hampshire and Pennsylvania.

His influences included original pre-war acoustic blues players and singers such as Lightnin’ Hopkins, Robert Johnson, Bessie Smith, and Blind Willie McTell, and later folk musicians and interpreters of the blues, including Bob Dylan, Tom Rush, Bonnie Raitt, and Dave van Ronk.

Career 
Bartley had his first paying gig in 1970, at a Boston coffeehouse. By 1973, he was able to make a living playing in bars and coffee houses, and he toured nationally for the next decade and a half. It was during this period that he won four guitars at the Walnut Valley Festival in Winfield, Kansas, winning every year from 1984 to 1987. During the 1980s, he also participated in and was inspired by the Fast Folk Music Cooperative. Since 1994, he has regularly accompanied folk legend Tom Paxton, who considers him one of the world's best guitar players, and Bartley was instrumental in the creation of the 2004 Tom Paxton signature model Martin guitar.

Can Tab Lounge and the bluegrass connection 
In 1991, he began hosting a folk singer-songwriter open mic at the Can Tab Lounge in Cambridge every Monday evening. The success of the folk open mic led the venue asked him in 1993 to host Tuesday evenings as well, and he decided to make that a bluegrass event. Bluegrass Tuesdays eventually became what master fiddler and Berklee professor of music Matt Glaser called "the epicenter of bluegrass in Boston," and multiple bluegrass bands have met each other and gained experience through jamming in the Cantab's basement and stairwells and performing on its stage. In 2016, the Boston Bluegrass Union recognized Bartley's contributions to bluegrass with its Industry Heritage Award.

Songwriting 
A widely respected and prize-winning songwriter and composer, Bartley's songs have been recorded by numerous artists and licensed for film and television. His song "Sunny Side of Town" won the 2015 Podunk Bluegrass Festival Songwriters Competition. His recordings Put the Big Stone Down (2009) and Mercy for the Dispossessed (2011) both reached number one on the international Folk DJ Radio chart. Through his open mics, he has been a mentor to many aspiring songwriters. The folk press has called him a world-class guitarist, a brilliant songwriter, and the prophet and spiritual godfather of the Boston folk scene.

Discography 
 Blues Beneath the Surface (1984)
 Interstates (1986)
 I Am the Heart (1989)
 One Kind Word (1998)
 Hear That Wind Howl (1999)
 Bones and Breath (with Timothy Mason) (2003)
 Interstates (2005)
 Blackbirds in the Pie (2008)
 Put The Big Stone Down (2010)
 Mercy for the Dispossessed (2011)
 Uncle Wiggly's Bicycle Ride (2015)
 Particles of Light (September 2016)

References

External links
 Official Website
 AllMusic – Geoff Bartley
 Geoff Bartley Music video channel

1948 births
Living people
American folk guitarists
American male guitarists
American folk musicians
Fast Folk artists
American singer-songwriters
American male singer-songwriters
American blues singers
American blues guitarists
Waterbug Records artists